Écoute is a sculpture by French artist Henri de Miller in Paris. It is a giant stone head with cupped hand in front of the Church of St-Eustache. It is near to another sculpture by the same artist; a very large sundial designed by the astronomer Dandrel and made by the sculptor, in the Jardin des Halles, above the Forum des Halles.

References

Outdoor sculptures in France
Stone sculptures